Martín Gastón Demichelis (born 20 December 1980) is an Argentine former professional footballer who played usually as a centre-back, although he could also operate as a defensive midfielder. He is the current head coach of River Plate.

Demichelis spent most of his professional career with Bayern Munich in Germany (seven and a half years), winning 11 major titles with the team. He also competed in his home country with River Plate, in Spain with Espanyol and Málaga and in England with Manchester City.

Demichelis earned 51 caps for Argentina, representing the country in two World Cups – finishing second in 2014 – and the 2015 Copa América, where the team were also runners-up.

Club career

River Plate
Born in Justiniano Posse, Córdoba, Demichelis started playing professionally in 2001, with Buenos Aires-based Club Atlético River Plate, having arrived at the club's youth system three years earlier.

He made his first-team – and first division – debut on 2 September 2001 in a game against Estudiantes de La Plata, scoring his only goal for the team against Rosario Central.

On 28 April 2002, River Plate goalkeeper Ángel Comizzo was sent off with a minute of regulation time remaining against Racing Club de Avellaneda, leaving Demichelis to take over in goal. He faced a direct free kick that hit the wall and was countered for the only goal of the game by Nelson Cuevas, as River won the Clausura title.

Bayern Munich

Demichelis signed for FC Bayern Munich in the 2003 summer, for €4.5 million. His first season in the Bundesliga was not very positive as he suffered a number of minor injuries, appearing in only 14 league games (21 in total) as the Bavarians finished in second position; in early 2004 he appeared in his only game with the reserves, against Stuttgarter Kickers.

Under new coach Felix Magath, Demichelis became a regular starter for Bayern, appearing in 75 official matches in two seasons combined as the team won back-to-back doubles, achieving a total of four during his spell.

New Bayern boss Ottmar Hitzfeld successfully reconverted Demichelis from a defensive midfielder into a central defender. In 2008–09 he netted a career-best four goals in 29 games, but the title was lost to VfL Wolfsburg. However, the player often clashed with the new manager Louis van Gaal, starting immediately after the first matchday after being dropped from the starting XI for the 2010–11 opener against Wolfsburg, with Demichelis requesting that van Gaal omit him from the squad altogether, which the coach did; the player thereafter voiced to the press that it would be probable that he and the club went separate ways.

On 29 October 2010, benefitting from a run of injuries in the squad, Demichelis made one of his last appearances for Bayern, heading a goal in a 4–2 home win against SC Freiburg.

Málaga and Atlético Madrid

In late December 2010, Demichelis agreed to a deal with Spanish club Málaga CF, initially until the end of the 2010–11 season, with the latter retaining the option to extend the contract for a further two seasons. He rejoined former River Plate manager Manuel Pellegrini, and made his La Liga debut on 8 January 2011, scoring in a 1–1 home draw against Athletic Bilbao.

During his first four months with Málaga, Demichelis was sent off twice, but also started in all the matches he was available, being essential – as another January 2011 signee, Júlio Baptista – as the club eventually avoided relegation. On 22 August 2012 he scored the club's first-ever UEFA Champions League goal, netting the opener in the 2–0 playoff home win against Panathinaikos FC (also the aggregate score).

On 11 July 2013, Demichelis signed for Atlético Madrid on a one-year contract, after his deal with Málaga expired. In December he started legal action against the latter over "non-payments", relating to "€400,000 of unpaid wages as well as bonuses".

Manchester City
On 1 September 2013, Demichelis joined former Málaga boss Pellegrini and signed with Manchester City, penning a two-year contract for a reported £4.2 million. He had been with Atlético for less than two months, and had yet to make an appearance.

Demichelis made his first appearance for his new club on 27 October 2013, starting in a 1–2 Premier League loss at Chelsea after recovering from a knee injury. On 18 February of the following year, he was sent off against FC Barcelona in the club's Champions League round-of-16 0–2 home defeat, after fouling Lionel Messi and giving away a penalty.

Despite Demichelis's rocky start at City, Pellegrini kept faith in him. On 15 March 2014, after club captain Vincent Kompany was sent off, he was instrumental in a 2–0 victory over Hull City. The following weekend he scored his first goal, contributing to a 5–0 home win over Fulham; his good run of form in the last two months of the season helped his team win the league title, and also helped him rejoin the national side.

On 12 March 2015, Demichelis renewed his expiring contract until June of the following year. A year later, he was charged by The Football Association for 12 breaches of their rules against gambling on matches, and accepted the charge; he was fined £22,058 for the breach.

On 10 June 2016, Demichelis was released.

Return to Spain
On 10 August 2016, at nearly 36, Demichelis signed a one-year contract RCD Espanyol in Spain's top flight. On 10 January 2017, however, after only two appearances, he was released.

A week after his exit from Espanyol, Demichelis returned to Málaga's La Rosaleda Stadium, on a five-month deal. On 15 May 2017, he announced his retirement.

International career

Demichelis was first called up for Argentina in 2005 to compete at the year's FIFA Confederations Cup in Germany, where he was unused by the runners-up. He made his debut under José Pekerman on 12 November 2005 that year, in a 3–2 friendly loss to England at the Stade de Genève in Switzerland, playing as a defensive midfielder; he was not chosen for the 2006 FIFA World Cup.

On 11 September 2007, Demichelis scored his first international goal, heading the only goal of a friendly against Australia at the Melbourne Cricket Ground. He suffered a facial injury during an exhibition game with Germany on 3 March 2010, being sidelined for three weeks, and later being selected for the year's World Cup in South Africa. Under Diego Maradona, he played in all of Argentina's games at the tournament, partnering Nicolás Burdisso in central defence in an eventual quarter-final exit; on 22 June, he scored the first goal in the 2–0 group stage win against Greece.

Demichelis lost his place in the national side in November 2011, after a World Cup qualifier against Bolivia. A two-and-a-half-year absence followed, until he was included in Alejandro Sabella's provisional 30-man squad for the 2014 World Cup. He ended up making the final list. On the bench for the team's first four games, Demichelis made his debut in the tournament in the 1–0 quarter-final win over Belgium in which he played the full 90 minutes, taking the place of Federico Fernandez. He went on to start in the semi-finals where his team eliminated the Netherlands in a penalty shootout after a 0–0 draw, and again in the final against Germany and picked up the runners-up medal as Argentina lost 1–0 after extra time.

Demichelis was chosen for the 2015 Copa América in Chile, making his debut in the final group game, a 1–0 win over Jamaica, as a starter in place of Nicolás Otamendi. He then played the semi-final against Paraguay and the final defeat to the hosts, alongside Otamendi and in place of illness-stricken Ezequiel Garay.

Coaching career
In May 2017, immediately after retiring, Demichelis remained at Málaga as assistant manager to Míchel, replacing Weligton who had returned to Brazil due to injury. He remained in employment after the head coach was dismissed in January, but was not as involved under his successor José González. 

Demichelis returned to Bayern in June 2019, to manage the under-19 team.  On 2 April 2021, it was announced that he and Danny Schwarz would replace Holger Seitz as FC Bayern Munich II manager. His first match as coach of a senior team was on 17 July, a 3–0 win at FC Augsburg II on the first day of the Regionalliga Bayern season.

In October 2022, Demichelis obtained a UEFA Pro coaching license after passing the yearly course organised by the Italian Football Federation. On 16 November that year, he returned to River Plate as the club's new head coach, signing a contract until December 2025.

Personal life
Demichelis also holds an Italian passport. He and his wife, model Evangelina Anderson, have a son and two daughters. On 19 February 2019, a group of burglars broke into his house in Spain, stealing cash and jewellery before he chased them out.

Career statistics

Club

International

Scores and results list Argentina's goal tally first, score column indicates score after each Demichelis goal.

Coaching record

1.In the 2020–21 season, Martin Demichelis co-managed together with Danny Schwarz.

Honours
River Plate
Argentine Primera División: Clausura 2002, Clausura 2003

Bayern Munich
Bundesliga: 2004–05, 2005–06, 2007–08, 2009–10
DFB-Pokal: 2004–05, 2005–06, 2007–08, 2009–10
DFB-Ligapokal: 2004, 2007
DFL-Supercup: 2010
UEFA Champions League runner-up: 2009–10

Manchester City
Premier League: 2013–14
Football League Cup: 2013–14, 2015–16

Argentina
FIFA World Cup runner-up: 2014
FIFA Confederations Cup runner-up: 2005
Copa América runner-up: 2015

Individual
kicker Bundesliga Team of the Season: 2007–08

References

External links

1980 births
Living people
Sportspeople from Córdoba Province, Argentina
Naturalised citizens of Italy
Argentine footballers
Argentine football managers
Association football defenders
Association football midfielders
Association football utility players
Argentine Primera División players
Club Atlético River Plate footballers
Bundesliga players
FC Bayern Munich II players
FC Bayern Munich footballers
La Liga players
Málaga CF players
Atlético Madrid footballers
RCD Espanyol footballers
Premier League players
Manchester City F.C. players
Argentina international footballers
2005 FIFA Confederations Cup players
2010 FIFA World Cup players
2014 FIFA World Cup players
2015 Copa América players
FC Bayern Munich II managers
3. Liga managers
Club Atlético River Plate managers
Argentine expatriate footballers
Expatriate footballers in Germany
Expatriate footballers in Spain
Expatriate footballers in England
Argentine expatriate sportspeople in Germany
Argentine expatriate sportspeople in Spain
Argentine expatriate sportspeople in England
Outfield association footballers who played in goal
Expatriate football managers in Germany
Argentine expatriate football managers